Tillandsia socialis is a species of flowering plant in the genus Tillandsia. This species is endemic to Mexico. It was first described in 1958.

References

socialis
Flora of Mexico
Plants described in 1958